Pachypanchax varatraza is a species of Aplocheilid killifish endemic to Madagascar where it is found in the Menambery, Fanambana and Ampanobe rivers.  Its natural habitat is streams and pools. It is threatened by invasive species.

References

 Loiselle, P. 2006. A review of the Malagasy Pachypanchax (Teleostei: Cyprinodontiformes, Aplocheilidae), with descriptions of four new species. Zootaxa 1366: 1–44 (2006)
 

varatraza
Taxa named by Paul V. Loiselle
Freshwater fish of Madagascar
Taxonomy articles created by Polbot
Fish described in 2006